Methacryloyloxyethyl isocyanate is an extremely poisonous liquid which can be fatal if inhaled, absorbed through skin, or consumed orally. To a lesser extent it can burn eyes and skin on contact.  It is used as a cross-linker in the production of synthetic resins.

References

Isocyanates